Badlands of Dakota is a 1941 American Western film directed by Alfred E. Green and starring Robert Stack, Ann Rutherford, Richard Dix and Frances Farmer. Its plot follows a sheriff and his girlfriend who cross paths with Wild Bill Hickok and Calamity Jane.

Stack called it "one of the most forgettable Westerns ever made, a nonmasterpiece."

Plot
A sheriff (Robert Stack) and his girlfriend (Ann Rutherford) run into Wild Bill Hickok, Gen. Custer and Calamity Jane (Frances Farmer).

Cast

References

External links

1941 Western (genre) films
American Western (genre) films
Universal Pictures films
1941 films
Films directed by Alfred E. Green
Films scored by Frank Skinner
American black-and-white films
Cultural depictions of Wild Bill Hickok
Cultural depictions of Calamity Jane
1940s English-language films
1940s American films